Pakistan competed at the 2019 World Championships in Athletics in Doha, Qatar, from 27 September-6 October 2019, with their sole athlete, Arshad Nadeem, competing in the men's javelin throw event.

Results

Men 
Field events

References 

Nations at the 2019 World Athletics Championships
2019 in Pakistani sport
Pakistan at the World Championships in Athletics